Edmund Willard (19 December 1884 – 6 October 1956) was a British actor of the 1930s and 1940s.

Born in Brighton, Sussex in 1884, the nephew of Victorian era actor Edward Smith Willard, in 1920 Willard appeared in the plays of William Shakespeare at the Royal Shakespeare Theatre in Stratford-upon-Avon. He appeared in Hamlet, Twelfth Night, The Merchant of Venice, Richard III, and The Taming of the Shrew.

Willard's first film role was as the Fourth Party in A Window in Piccadilly (1928). His other film appearances include The Private Life of Don Juan (1934) with Douglas Fairbanks and Merle Oberon, The Scarlet Pimpernel (1934) with Leslie Howard and Raymond Massey, The Mystery of the Mary Celeste (1935) with Bela Lugosi, Van Zeeland in Rembrandt (1936) with Charles Laughton and Gertrude Lawrence, the Chief Steward in Underneath the Arches (1937) with Bud Flanagan, Chesney Allen and The Crazy Gang, the Chief of German Intelligence in Dark Journey (1937) with Vivien Leigh and Conrad Veidt, Hoots Mon! (1940) with Max Miller, Penn of Pennsylvania  (1942) with Clifford Evans and Deborah Kerr, and The Young Mr. Pitt (1942) with Robert Donat and Robert Morley.

His television roles included appearances in Fabian of the Yard (1954), The Errol Flynn Theatre (1956) and The Scarlet Pimpernel (1956).

Willard married Mabel Theresa Tebbs (1885-1974) in 1907 at Steyning in Sussex. They had a daughter, the children's author Barbara Willard, and a son, Christopher Willard (died 1944).

Edmund Willard died in 1956 in Kingston, London, aged 71.

Partial filmography

 The Green Orchard (1916) - Tony Rye
 A Window in Piccadilly (1928) - The Fourth Party
 Cape Forlorn (1931) - Henry Cass
 A Night in Montmartre (1931) - Alexandre
 The Crooked Lady (1932) - Joseph Garstin
 Rynox (1932) - Capt. James
 La mille et deuxième nuit (1933) - The Sultan (English version, voice)
 The Fear Ship (1933) - Jack Arkwright
 The Private Life of Don Juan (1934) - Prisoner (uncredited)
 The Iron Duke (1934) - Marshal Ney
 The Scarlet Pimpernel (1934) - Bibot - Republican Officer (uncredited)
 William Tell (1934) - Walter Fuerst
 Heat Wave (1935) - Hoffman
 Moscow Nights (1935) - Officer of Prosecution
 The Mystery of the Mary Celeste (1935) - Toby Bilson
 King of the Damned (1935) - The Greek
 Royal Eagle (1936) - Burnock
 Rembrandt (1936) - Van Zeeland
 The Mill on the Floss (1936) - (uncredited)
 Dark Journey (1937) - General Berlin of German Intelligence
 Underneath the Arches (1937) - Chief Steward
 Farewell Again (1937) - Pvt. Withers
 Smash and Grab (1937) - Cappellano
 Make It Three (1938) - Big Ed
 The Stars Look Down (1940) - Mr. Ramage
 Hoots Mon! (1940) - Sandy McBride
 Pastor Hall (1940) - Freundlich
 Atlantic Ferry (1941) - Robert Napier
 Penn of Pennsylvania (1942) - Ship's Captain
 The Young Mr. Pitt (1942) - Minor Role (uncredited)
 Cardboard Cavalier (1949) - Oliver Cromwell
 Helter Skelter (1949) - Ezekial
 Up in the World (1956) - Judge (uncredited) (final film role)

References

External links

Willard on Allmovie.com
Willard on The Complete Index To World Film since 1895

1884 births
1956 deaths
English male film actors
English male television actors
English male stage actors
20th-century English male actors
People from Brighton